To Know That You're Alive is the fifth full-length studio album by the Christian rock band Kutless. It was released on June 24, 2008. It is their first album to feature guitarist Nick DePartee, who took over the position after long-time member Ryan Shrout left the band in May 2007.  The album debuted at No. 64 on the Billboard 200 album chart and stayed on the chart for six weeks. The album reached The Billboard Christian Albums chart peaking at No. 1, where it stayed for 27 weeks. The album's first rock single, "The Feeling", hit No. 11 on ChristianRock.net in its first week. The song was released as downloadable content for the Rock Band series.

Track listing

Personnel 

Kutless
 Jon Micah Sumrall - lead vocals
 Nick De Partee - lead guitar, backing vocals
 James Mead     - rhythm guitar, backing vocals
 Dave Luetkenhoelter - bass guitar
 Jeffrey Gilbert     - Drums

Additional musicians
 Pete Kipley – string arrangements and conductor 
 Nick Ingman – string arrangements (5)
 The London Session Orchestra – strings
 Pete Steward – backing vocals 

Production
 Pete Kipley – producer, engineer 
 Tyson Paoletti – executive producer, A&R 
 Kevin Sheppard – A&R
 Steve Churchyard – engineer 
 Buckley Miller – engineer, mix assistant 
 Mike "X" O'Connor – engineer 
 F. Reid Shippen – engineer, mixing 
 Simon Rhodes – orchestra recording 
 Troy Glessner – mastering 
 Geoff Barrios – drum technician 
 Invisible Creature, Inc. – art direction 
 Don Clark – design 
 Dave Hill – band photography

Music video

A music video was released for "To Know That You're Alive". It shows the band playing in a street where a car accident has taken a place. An ambulance comes and rushes a woman in the wreck to the hospital. Once there, it is shown that the woman is pregnant and clearly going into labor. The doctors rush to deliver the woman's baby. The video ends with the woman and the baby alive and together in the hospital room.

Awards

The album was nominated for a Dove Award for Rock Album of the Year at the 40th GMA Dove Awards.

References

Kutless albums
2008 albums
BEC Recordings albums
Tooth & Nail Records albums